Terahertz radiation is  electromagnetic waves within the ITU-designated band of frequencies from 0.1 to 30 terahertz.

T-ray may also refer to:

 T-Ray (comics), a fictional Marvel Comics character, Nemesis to Deadpool
 T-Ray (producer) (aka Todd Ray), music producer